= Brita dance =

Bengali folk dance

Brita dance (Bengali: বৃতা নৃত্য) or Vrita dance is a traditional Bengali folk dance from West Bengal, India. It is performed by Bengali women in rural areas to ask the deity to bless them with children and to show gratitude for helping them recover from contagious diseases like chicken pox. The folk dance is performed on the temple premises, both before and after their wishes are fulfilled.
